Ceropegia fusca is a flowering plant in the genus Ceropegia (Apocynaceae). It is endemic to the Canary Islands, where it grows on Tenerife (especially the Macizo de Anaga area), Gran Canaria, and La Palma in the Tabaibal-Cardonal zone at up to about 600 m altitude.

Description
Ceropegia fusca forms erect woody stems reaching to 1.5 m tall. The leaves are deciduous, arranged in opposite pairs, each leaf narrow, 5 cm long. The flowers are produced in clusters of two to five in the leaf axils; they are tubular, reddish brown, with five narrow lobes joined at the tip; flowering is in spring to summer. The fruit is a pair of large capsules up to 10 cm long.

Cultivation
Ceropegia fusca is used as an ornamental plant in dry and drought tolerant water conserving gardens. It requires hot conditions to grow well.

References and external links
Pérez, M. Á. C. (1999). Native Flora of the Canary Islands. Everest, León. .
Sightings of Ceropegia fusca

fusca
Endemic flora of the Canary Islands
Garden plants of Europe
Drought-tolerant plants
Taxa named by Carl Bolle